Events from the year 1822 in the United States.

Incumbents

Federal Government 
 President: James Monroe (DR-Virginia)
 Vice President: Daniel D. Tompkins (DR-New York)
 Chief Justice: John Marshall (Virginia)
 Speaker of the House of Representatives: Philip P. Barbour (DR-Virginia)
 Congress: 17th

Events
 March 30 – The U.S. merges East Florida with part of West Florida to form the Florida Territory.
 July 1–3 – U.S. House of Representatives elections begin in Louisiana and continue until the last elections are held in North Carolina on August 14, 1823.
 July 2 – Denmark Vesey is hanged for plotting a slave rebellion in Charleston, South Carolina.
 July 4 – A 24th star is added to the flag of the United States, representing Missouri which had been admitted on August 10, 1821.
 August 22 – The English ship Orion lands at Yerba Buena, modern-day San Francisco, under the command of William A. Richardson.
 November 9 – Action of 9 November 1822:  engages three pirate schooners off the coast of Cuba as part of the West Indies anti-piracy operations of the U.S.
 November 23 – The USS Alligator wrecks on Carysford Reef off the coast of Florida.
 December 5 – Edward Coles is inaugurated as the second governor of Illinois, Preceding Shadrach Bond.

Undated
 Ashley's Hundred leave from St. Louis, setting off a major increase in fur trade.
 A committee is formed to collect remains from the remote location where the Battle of Minisink had been fought in 1779.
 The last major outbreak of yellow fever in New York City occurs.
 Gist Mansion is built in Wellsburg, West Virginia (used some 100 years later for the Brooke Hills Spooktacular).

Ongoing
 Era of Good Feelings (1817–1825)

Births
 February 4 – Edward Fitzgerald Beale, U.S. Navy lieutenant and explorer (died 1893)
 February 13 – James B. Beck, Scottish-born U.S. Senator from Kentucky from 1877 to 1890 (died 1890)
 c. March – Harriet Tubman, born Araminta Ross, African-American abolitionist, humanitarian, and Union spy during the American Civil War (died 1913)
 March 12 – Thomas Buchanan Read, poet and portrait painter (died 1872)
 March 16 – John Pope, career United States Army officer and Union general in the American Civil War (died 1892)
 April 3 – Edward Everett Hale, writer (died 1909)
 April 26 – Frederick Law Olmsted, landscape architect (died 1903)
 April 27 – Ulysses S. Grant, 18th President of the United States from 1869 to 1877 (died 1885)
 May 18 – Mathew B. Brady, pioneer photographer (died 1896)
 June 10 –
 John Jacob Astor III, businessman (died 1890)
 Lydia White Shattuck, botanist (died 1889)
 July 21 – Alexander H. Jones, Congressional Representative from North Carolina. (died 1901)
 July 25 – Andrew Bryson, admiral (died 1892)
 August 15
 James E. Bailey, U.S. Senator from Tennessee from 1877 to 1881 (died 1885)
 Virginia Eliza Clemm Poe, wife of Edgar Allan Poe (died 1847)
 August 27 – William Hayden English, politician (died 1896)
 September 11 – Francis S. Thayer, merchant and politician (died 1880)
 September 16 – Charles Crocker, financiers (died 1888)
 September 17 – Cornelius Cole, U.S. Senator from California from 1867 to 1873 (died 1924)
 September 19 – Joseph R. West, U.S. Senator from Louisiana from 1871 to 1877 (died 1898)
 September 20 – Elizabeth Smith Miller, women's rights campaigner (died 1911)
 October 4 – Rutherford B. Hayes, 19th President of the United States from 1877 to 1881 (died 1893)
 Undated – Red Cloud (Maȟpíya Lúta), Oglala Lakota chief (died 1909)

Deaths
 April 8 – James Long, U.S. Filibuster, founder of the Long Republic - the first "Republic of Texas". Shot by a prison guard in Mexico City, Mexico (born 1793).
 May 6 – Charles Peale Polk, portrait painter (born 1767)
 May 8 – John Stark, major general in the Continental Army during the American Revolution (born 1728)
 July 2 – Denmark Vesey, African American leader, hanged (born c.1767)
 August 28 – William Logan, U.S. Senator from Kentucky from 1819 to 1820 (born 1776)
 October 31 – Jared Ingersoll, U.S. presidential candidate (born 1749)

See also
Timeline of United States history (1820–1859)

References

External links
 

 
1820s in the United States
United States
United States
Years of the 19th century in the United States